The phrase baptism by fire generally refers to a soldier's first experience under fire in battle.

Baptized by fire or Baptized by Fire may also refer to:

 Baptized By Fire (band) an American rock band from the greater New York area, formed in 2006
 Baptized By Fire (Spinnerette song), on the album Spinnerette by the band of the same name
Baptized by Fire, album by Dave Bonney featuring Willie Duncan
"Baptized by Fire", song by Winger from In the Heart of the Young
"Baptized by Fire", song by Znowhite from Act of God
"Baptized by Fire", song by Hirax from El Rostro de la Muerte

See also
Baptism of Fire (disambiguation)